Shahida Nighat Jamil (born 30 January 1944 as Shahida Nighat Sulaiman) is a Pakistani lawyer and politician who served as the Law Minister of Pakistan.

Early education and family
Jamil is the only daughter of the late Shah Ahmed Sulaiman (a businessman and son of Sir Shah Sulaiman) and the late Begum Akhtar Sulaiman (a prominent social worker and daughter of Huseyn Shaheed Suhrawardy).

She was called to the Bar in 1973. Prior to that she graduated from Sindh Muslim Law College and holds a Bachelor of Arts degree in political science and English literature from Karachi University through St. Joseph's College.

She is married to Chaudhry Mohammad Jamil (a senior advocate of the Supreme Court of Pakistan and former Vice-President of the Pakistan Supreme Court Bar Association). They have two sons, Zahid Jamil (a barrister in Karachi) and Shahid Jamil (a solicitor in Chicago).

Political career

She became the first woman to be appointed the Law Minister of Sindh province in 1999 and became the Minister of Law, Justice and Human Rights and Parliamentary Affairs of Pakistan in 2000. She has also served as Minister for Women Development, Social Welfare and Special Education in the caretaker government of Prime Minister Mohammad Mian Soomro from 2007 to 2008.

Publications
She has conducted an in-depth research study on different subjects such as Socio-Political Environment as an Element of Power and its impact on National Security, Crime Reporting, Internal Security Systems in South Asia & Dimensions of National Security etc.

Teaching Experience
She has been teaching in SM Law College as a Professor of Law to LLB and LLM students for a long time. Now she is a visiting professor at School of Law at University of the Karachi. She has a firm grip on human rights and constitutional laws of the world.

Articles published by her include Independence of the Judiciary, International Humanitarian Law, The Daily News in 1992, The Legacy of Negativism, The Leader in 1995, In which the name of Allah is commemorated - Al-Quran, The Nation in 1997, and The Armed Forces and the Pakistan Movement, The Dawn in 1997.

Sources 
 https://web.archive.org/web/20110604190632/http://www.infopak.gov.pk/WomenDevelopmentminister.aspx

 http://www.pakistanherald.com/profile/Barrister-Shahida-Jamil-1124

1944 births
Pakistani lawyers
Pakistani women lawyers
Living people
Federal ministers of Pakistan
University of Karachi alumni
Sindh Muslim Law College alumni
Pakistani people of Bengali descent
Women federal ministers of Pakistan
Suhrawardy family
St Joseph's Convent School, Karachi alumni
20th-century Bengalis
21st-century Bengalis